Stromanthe sanguinea is a plant species in the arrowroot family Marantaceae, native to the Brazilian rainforest.

It is a common houseplant in temperate climates, valued for its striking variegated leaves with purple undersides. It can grow outside in a humid tropical climate, but needs light shade in the afternoon and must be protected from high winds.

The soil should be kept moist at all times, but never waterlogged as the plant is susceptible to root rot. When the plant is under full shade the distinctive variegation is lost and the leaves become solid green.

Hummingbirds and bees are the main pollinators.

Propagation can be from either seeds or rhizome division, but it is faster and more reliable to take rhizome cuttings.

Stromanthe sanguinea has received the Royal Horticultural Society's Award of Garden Merit.

Gallery

References

House plants
sanguinea
Garden plants of South America
Taxa named by Otto Wilhelm Sonder